Wewak District is a district of East Sepik Province in Papua New Guinea. It is one of the six administrative districts that make up the province. The main town is Wewak.

See also
Districts of Papua New Guinea

Districts of Papua New Guinea
East Sepik Province